Kandana Arachchige Dinusha Manoj Fernando (born 10 August 1979), or Dinusha Fernando, is a Sri Lankan cricketer. He is a right-handed batsman and a right-arm medium-fast bowler. He studied at St. Sebastian's College, Moratuwa.

Domestic career
He made his Twenty20 debut on 17 August 2004, for Sebastianites Cricket and Athletic Club in the 2004 SLC Twenty20 Tournament.

Fernando has played as an Overseas player in England for several years, including for Bromyard CC in the Worcestershire County League Division 1 from 2011 to 2013, and in 2015.  In 2017 he played for Brockhampton CC in the Birmingham and District League Premier Division.

International career
A useful middle-order batsman, he initially impressed during 2001 in the Sri Lankan Test series against England. However, despite having had several quality performances for his club, he did not get into the Test squad until November 2003. He bowled to get 2–13 against England in Dambulla in his only ODI. He played in the first two tests of the subsequent series against England, but was dropped after that.

References

External links

1979 births
Living people
Sri Lanka One Day International cricketers
Sri Lankan Roman Catholics
Sri Lanka Test cricketers
Sri Lankan cricketers
Sebastianites Cricket and Athletic Club cricketers
Badureliya Sports Club cricketers
Panadura Sports Club cricketers
Nondescripts Cricket Club cricketers
Sri Lanka Air Force Sports Club cricketers
Chilaw Marians Cricket Club cricketers
Colombo Cricket Club cricketers